Mark Chang Mun Kee (born 1965) is a Malaysian businessman and the founder of MOL AccessPortal and JobStreet.com. He is the chief executive officer of JobStreet.com, a position he has retained since the company was formed. He also serves on the boards of Vitrox Technologies, Innity Corporation Berhad and 104 Corporation, Taiwan.

Early life and career
In 1988, Chang acquired a Bachelor of Science in Mechanical Engineering from the University of Texas in 1988 and later attended the Massachusetts Institute of Technology where he was awarded a Master of Science in Mechanical Engineering in 1990.

He once worked with Kendall International as a process engineer(1990), manufacturing manager (1992) and finally the regional director of sales and marketing for Malaysia (1994). After years of deep immersion in the world of the Internet, he began his dot.com journey with the establishment of MOL Online Sdn Bhd (currently MOL AccessPortal) in 1995, which was Malaysia's first commercial website, offering portal services. Its most profitable section, online job listings, was then spun off into JobStreet.com today.

Chang also serves as the Penang State Advisor for Persatuan Usahawan Muda Malaysia (PUMM), as well as an advisor in the AllStars program. Additionally, he is also known to be a mentor to Khai Yin, the founder of GoodPlace.my.

References

1965 births
Living people
Malaysian people of Chinese descent
Malaysian businesspeople
People from Kampar, Perak
Cockrell School of Engineering alumni
MIT School of Engineering alumni
People from Perak
University of Texas alumni